Lyropupa lyrata is a species of air-breathing land snail, terrestrial pulmonate gastropod mollusk in the family Pupillidae. This species is endemic to the United States.

References

Molluscs of the United States
lyrata
Gastropods described in 1843
Taxonomy articles created by Polbot